The  carries the Central Circular Route (C2) of the Shuto Expressway in Tokyo, Japan, from the Takamatsu on-ramp in Toshima to near the Ōi Junction in Shinagawa.

The roadway consists of two lanes in each direction. Nearly all of the tunnel lies beneath Yamate Dori. On completion the Yamate Tunnel surpassed the Kan'etsu Tunnel on the Kan-Etsu Expressway, to become the longest road tunnel in Japan and the second longest road tunnel in the world. Most of the tunnel follows the route of Yamate Street (Tokyo Metropolitan Route 317).

History
Plans for an expressway on the route were first drawn up around 1970, initially in the form of an elevated expressway over the Meguro River between Shibuya and Oimachi. The elevated expressway plan was shelved shortly thereafter, following concerns about environmental issues and local resident protests, but re-emerged in the 1990s in the form of a tunnel plan. The final plan for the southern portion of the tunnel, approved in 2004, followed Yamate Street and the Meguro River, in order to minimize tunneling under private property.

Construction on the Yamate Tunnel began in 1992. The Takamatsu–Nishi Shinjuku segment opened on 22 December 2007. On the same date, an above-ground segment linking the tunnel to the Kumanochō Interchange in Itabashi and Toshima also opened. The  section between Nishi Shinjuku and Ohashi opened on 28 March 2010. The last section linking Ohashi to the Bayshore Route opened on 7 March 2015.

Facilities

The tunnel has many operational and safety facilities. Among them are emergency telephones and cameras at  intervals. Fire-safety equipment includes infrared sensors, fire extinguishers, foam sprayers, and pushbutton alarms. Stairways lead up to Yamate Street. A duct running parallel to the roadway supplies fresh air and removes exhaust. Dust-collection systems are designed to remove 80 percent of particulates from the air.

The structure was used as the centerpiece of an urban planning project that includes the Meguro Sky Garden park and several high-rise condominium towers.

Ramps and junctions

Takamatsu Exit (northbound only) – Yamate Street, near Kanamecho Station
Nishi-ikebukuro Exit (southbound only) – Yamate Street, near Shiinamachi Station
Nakano-Chojabashi Exit (northbound only) – Yamate Street, south of Nakano-sakaue Station)
Nishi-Shinjuku Junction (interchange with westbound Route 4) – near Hatsudai Station
Hatsudai-minami Exit (southbound only) – Yamate Street, north of Yoyogi-Hachiman Station
Tomigaya Exit (northbound only) – Yamate Street, south of Yoyogi-Hachiman Station
Ōhashi Junction (interchange with Route 3) – southwest of Shibuya Station 
Gotanda Exit (northbound only) – Yamate Street, north of Fudomae Station

Other underground viaducts
The Yamate Tunnel passes above the Yūrakuchō and Ōedo subway lines. It crosses below the Tōzai and Marunouchi subway lines, as well as the Keiō and Keiō New Lines and the Tōkyū Den-en-toshi Line. Additionally, the tunnel parallels the Ōedo Line along a segment between Nakai and Nishi Shinjuku Gochome Stations. Nakai and Nakano Sakaue Stations, lying beneath the Yamate Tunnel, have escalators that pass between Yamate's two tunnels.

Further reading
 西澤丞著『首都高山手トンネル』求龍堂（2007年）

References

See also
Gotthard Base Tunnel

Shuto Expressway
Road tunnels in Japan
Tunnels completed in 2007